The 2015 Teen Choice Awards ceremony was held on August 16, 2015, at the Galen Center in Los Angeles, California. The awards celebrate the year's achievements in music, film, television, sports, fashion, comedy, video games, and the Internet, and were voted on by viewers living in the US, aged 13 and over, through various social media sites.

One Direction were the biggest winners of the night, winning eight of their ten nominations. Pretty Little Liars came in second by winning six of its ten nominations and Pitch Perfect 2 came in third, winning five of its ten nominations. Britney Spears was awarded with the "Candie's Choice Style Icon".

Performers
 5 Seconds of Summer — "She's Kinda Hot"
 Little Mix — "Black Magic"
 Jussie Smollett and Bryshere Y. Gray from Empire cast.
 Rachel Platten — "Fight Song"
 Flo Rida featuring Robin Thicke — "I Don't Like It, I Love It"

Presenters
 Sarah Hyland & Skylar Astin • Presented Choice Comedian
 Keke Palmer, Emma Roberts and Lea Michele • Presented Choice Sci-Fi/Fantasy Movie Actor
 Wiz Khalifa and Michelle Rodriguez • Presented Choice Breakout TV Show
 Bethany Mota and Laura Marano • Presented Choice Music Web Star
 Zendaya • Introduced Little Mix
 Rita Ora and Scott Eastwood • Presented Choice Drama Movie Actress
 Fifth Harmony • Presented Candie's Choice Style Icon
 Maia Mitchell & Lucy Hale • Presented Choice Male Athlete
 Cat Deeley & Jason Derulo • Presented Choice R&B/Hip-Hop Song & Choice Dancer
 Victoria Justice & Jake T. Austin • Presented Choice Sci-Fi/Fantasy TV Actress
 Terry Crews and Wilmer Valderrama • Presented Choice Action Movie
 Tyler Oakley and Bea Miller • Presented Choice Drama TV Show
 R5 • Presented Choice Summer Song
 Gregg Sulkin & Bella Thorne • Presented Choice Male Web Star & Choice Female Web Star

Theme song
Fans had the power to choose the official theme song for the show from July 24 through August 14, 2015. Zedd feat. Selena Gomez's "I Want You to Know" was chosen as the year's theme song.

Winners and nominees
The first wave of nominations were announced on June 9, 2015. The second wave was announced on July 8, 2015. The third wave was announced on July 30, 2015. Winners are listed first and highlighted in bold text.

Movies

Television

Music

Fashion

Sports

Digital

Miscellaneous

References

External links
 

Teen Choice Awards
Teen Choice
2015 in Los Angeles
August 2015 events in the United States